A Warrant of Fitness (WoF) is an official New Zealand document certifying that a light motor vehicle has passed a compulsory periodic inspection of safety and roadworthiness. Most vehicles with a gross mass under  that are used on public roads are required to undergo a WoF test, with the frequency depending on the age of the vehicle. Since 1 January 2014, vehicles first registered on or after 1 January 2000 must undergo a WoF test annually; older vehicles must undergo a WoF test every six months. From 1 July 2014, vehicles first registered on or after 1 January 2000 must undergo a WoF test at first registration, at three years, and then annually after that; older vehicles must undergo a WoF test every six months.

Instead, these vehicles must possess a Certificate of Fitness (CoF). The CoF test is similar to the WoF test, but must be undergone every six months regardless of the age of the vehicle.

A WoF test checks tyre condition, brake condition, structural condition, lights, glazing, windscreen wipers and washers, doors, seat belts, airbags (if fitted), speedometer, steering and suspension, exhaust, and fuel system. A vehicle must meet certain criteria in each category to pass the Warrant of Fitness. Many local car repair garages throughout New Zealand are authorised to perform testing and to issue Warrants of Fitness.

Each vehicle used on public roads must display a Warrant of Fitness sticker in the top right corner of its windscreen (as viewed from inside the vehicle). The sticker indicates that the vehicle passed its last WoF inspection, and shows when the next inspection is due. The current stickers display on the outside 2 holes punched, one through a number on the side indicating the month due (e.g. a hole through the number 4 indicates the next test is due in April) and one punched though the number on the bottom indicating the year due (e.g. a hole through the numbers 18 indicates the next test is due in 2018). On the inside, the sticker shows the full date of when the next inspection is due, the vehicle registration number, and the issuing agent stamp.

A vehicle with a current WoF can still be inspected by a police officer and ordered unroadworthy. If a vehicle lacks a WOF sticker, or its WOF is expired, the driver is liable for a NZ$200 fine. If a vehicle is found parked on a public road without a valid WoF sticker, the fine may be also issued by a parking warden.

See also
 VTNZ (a vehicle inspection company)

References

External links 
Warrants and certifications at the New Zealand Transport Agency

Road transport in New Zealand
Automotive safety
Certification marks